Another Year is an EP by New Zealand band Nocturnal Projections in 1982.

Track listing
All songs written and arranged by Nocturnal Projections (Copyright Control).
"You'll Never Know" 3:26
"Isn't that Strange" 3:26
"Could It Be Increased" 3:10
"Difficult Days" 5:35
"Out of My Hands" 4:26

References

Nocturnal Projections albums
1982 EPs